The yellow-bellied weasel (Mustela kathiah) is a species of weasel that inhabits pine forests in central and eastern Asia.

Description
The species is named for its yellow-colored underbelly; the upperside of the body and the tail are of a dark brown.

Taxonomy
Two subspecies are recognized: M. k. caporiaccoi (de Beaux, 1935) and M. k. kathiah (Hodgson, 1835).

Distribution and habitat
The yellow-bellied weasel occurs in Bhutan, Burma, China, India, Laos, Nepal, Pakistan, Thailand and Vietnam.

Ecology
Yellow-bellied weasels eat birds, mice, rats, voles, and other small mammals.

Yellow-bellied weasels first build a den in the ground. Breeding occurs annually. Mating occurs in late spring or early summer. Females are pregnant for about ten months. The female gives birth to 3-18 kits in April or May. By the time the kits are eight weeks old, they are ready to go out and hunt on their own.

References

Weasels
Mammals of China
Mammals of Nepal
Mammals of India
Mammals of Southeast Asia
Mammals described in 1835
Taxonomy articles created by Polbot